Miss Truth is an original Chinese television series based on a novel of the same title starring Zhou Jieqiong and Li Chengbin. It is aired on Youku on February 14, 2020, for 36 episodes.

Miss Truth has a 4.3 rating on Douban from over 13,000 reviews.

Synopsis
Miss Truth follows the story of forensic examiner Ran Yan, as she investigates the truth around her mother's suicide and solves murder cases one at a time. Ran Yan is an eighteen year old destitute noblewoman who grew up learning about autopsies and finding clues through corpses. She encounters a judicial official and an assassin by chance and finds true love through the course of searching for the truth.

Cast

Main
 Zhou Jieqiong as Ran Yan (冉颜), a highly talented Forensic examiner who took only 3 years to learn all her master's skills.
 Li Chengbin as Xiao Song (萧颂), Assistant Minister in the Ministry of Punishment.
Pei Zitian as Su Fu (苏伏), a top killer under the Huo Qi Organisation and Ran Yan's fiancé before they met in person.

Supporting
 Lan Bo as Sang Chen (桑辰), a teacher at the school. He is also a top Scholar and has a wide range of knowledge. His given name is Cui Chen (崔辰).
 Wang Yizhe as Bai Yi (白义), Xiao Song's right-hand man.
 Yuan Ziyun as Wan Lü (晚绿), Ran Yan's personal maid.
 Tu Hua as Ran Mei Yu (冉美玉), Ran Yan's half sister.
 Li Shuai as Minister Li
 Shi Liuyan as Princess Ba Ling (巴陵公主)

Official soundtrack

Miss Truth: Original Soundtrack
The following is the official track list of Miss Truth.

References

External links
 Miss Truth on Sina Weibo

Chinese historical television series
Television shows based on Chinese novels
2020 Chinese television series debuts
2020 web series debuts
Chinese web series
Youku original programming